Pungupungu may refer to:
Kandjerramalh language
Tyaraity dialect of Malak-Malak